BankNordik is a Faroe Islands-based financial services company that provides banking and insurance services.  It also provides some services in Denmark and Greenland. The Faeroese bank was previously known as Føroya Banki but after acquiring assets abroad, a new name was chosen to reflect its new market reach. It is one of the two full-service banking firms in the Faroe Islands.

The bank's services cover 40% of the market share in the Faroe Islands.

Mergers and acquisitions
Over the years BankNordik has acquired similar assets while also divesting from some markets.
In February 2010 it acquired 12 branches of Sparbank in Greenland.
In 2011 the bank acquired some assets of Amagerbanken.

References

External links
Bank Profile: P/F BankNordik

Financial services companies of the Faroe Islands